Crac! is the third album of the Jazz fusion band Area and was released in 1975. With this album, the band gained more popularity in Italy, thanks to songs like "L'elefante Bianco", "La Mela di Odessa (1920)" and "Gioia e Rivoluzione", which quickly became concert favourites. All songs were written by Tofani, Fariselli and Tavolazzi, except for "Area 5" which was written by Juan Hidalgo and Walter Marchetti.
When touring for this album the band even played in Paris and in Lisboa (as documented posthumously in the album "Parigi Lisbona" released in 1976, while a live album from their Italian tour was released later that year).

Track listing 
All tracks by Patrizio Fariselli, Ares Tavolazzi & Paolo Tofani except where noted.

Side one 
 "L'elefante Bianco" – 4:33
 "La Mela di Odessa (1920)" – 6:27
 "Megalopoli" – 7:53

Side two 
 "Nervi Scoperti" – 6:35
 "Gioia e Rivoluzione" – 4:40
 "Implosion" – 5:00
 "Area 5" (Juan Hidalgo, Walter Marchetti) – 2:09

Personnel 
 Giulio Capiozzo – drums, percussion
 Patrizio Fariselli – electric piano, piano, clarinet, synthesizer
 Demetrio Stratos – vocals, organ, harpsichord, steel drums, percussion
 Ares Tavolazzi – acoustic bass, electric bass, trombone
 Paolo Tofani – guitar, synthesizer, flute
 Piero Bravin – engineering
 Ambrogio Ferrario – engineering

References 

1975 albums
Area (band) albums